The 1977 American Airlines Tennis Games was a men's tennis tournament played on outdoor hard courts. It was the 4th edition of the Indian Wells Masters and was part of the 1977 Colgate-Palmolive Grand Prix. It was played at the Mission Hills Country Club in Rancho Mirage, California in the United States from February 21 through February 27, 1977. Brian Gottfried won the singles title.

Finals

Singles

 Brian Gottfried defeated  Guillermo Vilas 2–6, 6–1, 6–3
 It was Gottfried's 3rd title of the year and the 41st of his career.

Doubles

 Bob Hewitt /  Frew McMillan defeated  Marty Riessen /  Roscoe Tanner 7–6, 7–6
 It was Hewitt's 2nd title of the year and the 32nd of his career. It was McMillan's 2nd title of the year and the 37th of his career.

References

External links
 
 ATP tournament profile

 
1977 American Airlines Tennis Games
American Airlines Tennis Games
American Airlines Tennis Games
American Airlines Tennis Games
American Airlines Tennis Games